Switzerland participated in the Eurovision Song Contest 2000 in Stockholm, Sweden. Jane Bogaert represented Switzerland with the song "La vita cos'è?" after winning the national final Concours Eurovision 2000.

Before Eurovision

Concours Eurovision 2000 
The final was held at the Discoteca Prince in the Lugano Casino on 29 January 2000, hosted by Matteo Pelli. The combination of three televoting regions (50%) and the votes of an expert jury (50%) selected "La vita cos'è?" performed by Jane Bogaert as the winner. The jury included Carol Rich who represented Switzerland in 1987.

At Eurovision 
On the night of the contest, Jane Bogaert performed 16th in the running order, following Germany and preceding Croatia. At the close of the voting, she received 14 points, placing 20th in a field of 24, and thus relegating Switzerland from the 2001 contest.

Voting

References

2000
Countries in the Eurovision Song Contest 2000
Eurovision